Ashniz may refer to:
 Ashniz-e Bala